Currency of San Marino may refer to:

 Sammarinese lira (1860s–2002), pegged 1:1 to the Italian lira
 Euro (since 2002)